Antonio Bilbao La Vieja (1892–1980) was an Argentine architect and rugby union footballer. He spent his whole sports career at San Isidro and was the coach of the Argentina national team in 1927.

Biography 

Antonio Bilbao was born in Buenos Aires, son of Antonio Gervasio Bilbao and Edelmira Felisa Rosende Mitre, of Creoles origin. Their more remote ancestors were from La Rioja, Spain. He was an important Argentine architect, his first job was to build a great neighborhood park in La Tablada, (Greater Buenos Aires). Bilbao was Assistant Professor of Architecture Theory at University of Buenos Aires. And was member of the Scientific Society Argentina.

Sport career 
Bilbao began his sporting career playing in Estudiantes de La Plata. Later he played for San Isidro, club where was captain and coach. He was also head coach of the Argentina national rugby union team.

In the 1950s, Bilbao was part of the executive committee of the Argentine Rugby Union.

Titles 
All of them won with the Club Atlético San Isidro:

 Torneo de la URBA (15): 1917, 1918, 1920, 1921, 1922, 1923, 1924, 1925, 1926, 1927, 1928, 1929, 1930, 1933, 1934

References 

1892 births
1980 deaths
Argentine people of Basque descent
Argentine people of Spanish descent
Argentine people of Irish descent
Argentine rugby union players
Rugby union players from Buenos Aires
Argentine architects
B